The Jacksonville Fire and Rescue Department (JFRD) provides fire protection and emergency medical services for Jacksonville, Florida, as well as all unincorporated areas of Duval County.

According to a list of the thirty largest fire departments in the United States, based on staff size, JFRD is number eighteen.

Duval County has the fifth largest fire department in the state based on the number of fire stations. JFRD is among the largest departments in the state and the nation. The department is made up of six divisions, sixty-three fire and rescue station locations, a professional career force of roughly thirteen-hundred individuals.

History

In Jacksonville's early days, citizens responded to fires by forming formed bucket brigades. In 1852, Jacksonville upgraded its firefighting apparatus with the acquisition of a hand pumper. The wheeled pumper had large handles on each side, which were pumped up and down in a seesaw manner to create hydraulic pressure. On April 5, 1854, the hand pumper was put to the test when a spark from the paddle steamer Florida ignited a fire at the docks along Bay Street between Ocean and Newnan. The pumper proved no match for the conflagration, which destroyed the pumper along with 70 buildings, devastating Jacksonville's business district.

The city's first organized firefighting force was formed on January 10, 1868, when a group of volunteers created the Friendship Hook and Ladder Company. Several other volunteer companies were formed by 1870, and together they came to be known as the Jacksonville Volunteer Fire Department.

In 1876, a group of 22 African Americans organized the Duval Hose Company. Their station was located near the intersection of Pine and Ashley Streets. The Duval Hose Company soon became one of the most active volunteer companies in Jacksonville.

On December 16, 1885, an African American named Henry Bradley, was killed when a flaming wall collapsed onto him. Bradley thus became the first Jacksonville firefighter to die in the line of duty. The public outcry about Bradley's death, coupled with rising insurance rates due to Jacksonville's lack of a professional fire department, led to calls for change. Several fire insurance companies serving Jacksonville threatened to withdraw their coverage. Fire insurance rates went up by 25%, which threatened to halt the city's development.

On April 20, 1886, the Jacksonville City Council passed an ordinance creating a professional fire department. Peter Jones, former mayor of Jacksonville, was elected as the city's first fire chief. He was provided 17 men to staff 3 stations to protect the city area of approximately 39 square miles. Jones remained fire chief through the Great Fire of 1901.

Divisions
The Jacksonville Fire and Rescue Department has five divisions, all of which play an integral role in providing around the clock emergency response to the City of Jacksonville. Each one oversees specific tasks, but come together to form JFRD.

Discrimination controversy
In 1971, the JFRD became subject of a consent decree as part of a class action lawsuit, Coffey v. Braddy. The lawsuit was filed due to claims of discrimination against African-American applicants to the department. At the time of the suit, there were only two black firefighters in a department of almost 700. In 1984, the decree was modified to change hiring process at the JFRD. According to the decree, the department was required to hire a one-to-one ratio of black and white firefighters until the percentage of black firefighters equaled the percentage of blacks in the local population. This hiring restriction was fulfilled in 1992.

On August 8, 2006, the Jacksonville Human Rights Commission released a report after an investigation into a complaint of a racially hostile work environment. The complaint was filed in February 2006 after two black firefighters in the department arrived for duty and found nooses placed in their lockers. These charges were found to be inconclusive. The report found that, while operational performance was at a high standard, the off-duty behaviors of members of the department were a concern.

References

External links

Fire departments in Florida
Ambulance services in the United States
Fire Department
Organizations based in Jacksonville, Florida
Northbank, Jacksonville
Medical and health organizations based in Florida
1886 establishments in Florida